Gasteropelecus is a genus of freshwater hatchetfishes found in Central and South America.  This genus includes some popular aquarium fishes.  There are currently three described species in this genus.

Species
 Gasteropelecus levis (C. H. Eigenmann, 1909) (Silver hatchetfish)
 Gasteropelecus maculatus Steindachner, 1879 (Spotted hatchetfish)
 Gasteropelecus sternicla (Linnaeus, 1758) (River hatchetfish)

References

 

Gasteropelecidae
Taxa named by Giovanni Antonio Scopoli